Sokolovo is a rural locality (a selo) and the administrative center of Sokolovsky Selsoviet, Zonalny District, Altai Krai, Russia. The population was 3,224 as of 2013. There are 42 streets.

Geography 
Sokolovo is located 30 km southwest of Zonalnoye (the district's administrative centre) by road. Savinovo is the nearest rural locality.

References 

Rural localities in Zonalny District